Joseph C. Zakas (born November 7, 1950) is an American attorney and politician who served as a Republican member of the Indiana Senate for the 11th district from 1982 to 2018.

Early life and education 
Zakas was born in Chicago. He earned a Bachelor of Arts degree from the University of Illinois Urbana-Champaign in 1972 and a dual JD–MBA from the Notre Dame Law School.

Career 
Zakas worked as an attorney for Thorne Grodnik LLP in Elkhart, Indiana. He was first elected to the Indiana Senate in 1982, succeeding Dan Manion. He was the Republican nominee for Indiana's 3rd congressional district in 1996, losing in the general election by Democrat Tim Roemer. Zakas lost renomination to the State Senate in 2018.

References

External links
Joe Zakas at Ballotpedia
State Senator Joe Zakas Official Indiana State Legislature Site
Profile at Our Campaigns

1950 births
People from Granger, Indiana
Republican Party Indiana state senators
Living people
21st-century American politicians